The Giardino Botanico Litoraneo di Porto Caleri (nearly 23 hectares), also known as the Giardino Botanico Litoraneo del Veneto, is a nature preserve and botanical garden located on  Via Porto Caleri, Rosolina Mare, Rosolina, Province of Rovigo, Veneto, Italy. It is open several days a week in the warmer months.

The garden was established in 1990, and operated by the Servizio Forestale Regionale di Padova e Rovigo in collaboration with the University of Padua. It consists of a thin strip of sand dunes between the mouth of the river Adige and the Po di Levante, containing indigenous vegetation of loose sand, salt marsh, and pine and elm forests. All told, it contains a dozen ecosystems with about 220 plant species, including native orchids. Three footpaths (600 meters, 1650 meters, and 2850 meters in length) allow close observation of the environment.

Specimens
The garden's species include: 
 
Agropyretum juncei
 Agropyron junceum
 Ambrosia maritima
 Ammophila littoralis
 Ammophiletum arenariae
 Artemisia coerulescens
 Arthrocnemum fruticosum
 Aster tripolium
 Cakile marittima
 Calystegia soldanella
 Centaurea tommasinii
 Cephalantera
 Cladium mariscus
 Conyza canadensis
 Cycloloma atriplicifolia
 Cynodon dactylon
 Cyperus kalli
 Echinophoro spinosae
 Enteromorpha
 Erianthus ravennae
 Eryngium maritimum
 Frangula alnus
 Halimione portulacoides
 Hippophae rhamnoides
 Juniperus communis
 Limonium serotinum
 Oenothera biennis
 Ophrys sphecodes
 Orchis morio
 Phillyrea
 Phragmites australis
 Pinus pinaster
 Pinus pinea
 Puccinellia palustris
 Quercus ilex
 Scabiosa argentea
 Schoenus 
 nigricans
 Typha
 Ulmus minor
 Ulva
 Vulpia membranacea
 Xanthium italicum
 Zosteretum noltii

See also 
 List of botanical gardens in Italy

References 
 Comune di Rosolina - Giardino Botanico Litoraneo di Porto Caleri
 Magico Veneto description (Italian) with photographs
 Rosolina Mare description (Italian)
 Il Giardino Botanico Litoraneo del Veneto

Botanical gardens in Italy
Gardens in Veneto